Paner is a village in Ajmer district in Rajasthan. This village is associated with the folk-deity Tejaji, as it was his sasural.

See also
Tejaji
Sursura
Kharnal

References

 Mansukh Ranwa:  Kshatriya Shiromani Vir Tejaji (क्षत्रिय शिरोमणि वीर तेजाजी), 2001

Villages in Ajmer district